Stanisław Smolka (29 June 1854 in Lwów – 27 August 1924 in Nowoszyce) was a Polish historian.

1854 births
1924 deaths
20th-century Polish historians
Polish male non-fiction writers
Polish medievalists
Historians of Poland
Academic staff of the University of Lviv
Academic staff of Jagiellonian University
Recipients of the Order of Polonia Restituta
19th-century Polish historians